Remigny or Rémigny may refer to the following places:

in Canada
 Rémigny, Quebec

in France
 Remigny, Aisne, a commune in the department of Aisne
 Remigny, Saône-et-Loire, a commune in the department of Saône-et-Loire